James Hamilton is a Scottish curler. Hamilton played lead on Chuck Hay's team from the Kilgraston & Moncrieffe Curling Club in Perth, Scotland during the 1963 World Curling Championships known as the Scotch Cup. The team finished second out of the four teams that participated that year.

Teams

References

External links
 

Year of birth missing (living people)
Living people
Scottish male curlers
Scottish curling champions